Šumvald is a municipality and village in Olomouc District in the Olomouc Region of the Czech Republic. It has about 1,600 inhabitants.

Administrative parts
The village of Břevenec is an administrative part of Šumvald.

References

Villages in Olomouc District